The Nissan Diesel Space Runner RM (kana:日産ディーゼル・スペースランナーRM) was a medium-duty single-decker bus produced by the Japanese manufacturer Nissan Diesel (now known as UD Trucks) from 1975 until 2010. The range was only primarily available as city bus. It can be built as either a complete bus or a bus chassis.

It has a similar styling to the larger Space Runner RA that it has a rounded roof dome similar to the Space Runner RA with a double-curvature windscreen and a separately mounted destination blind.

Models 
RM90 (1975)
K-RM80 (1979)
P-RM81 (1984)
P-RB80 (1988)
U-RM/JM210 (1990)
KC-RM/JM211/250 (1995)
KK-RM/JM252 (1999)
PB-RM360 (2004)
PDG-RM820 (2007)

Competitors 
 Hino Rainbow
 Hino Rainbow HR
 Isuzu Erga Mio
 Mitsubishi Fuso Aero Midi
 Mitsubishi Fuso Aero Midi-S

External links 

Nissan Diesel Space Runner RM Homepage

Bus chassis
Buses of Japan
Low-floor buses
Midibuses
Step-entrance buses
Space Runner RM
UD trucks
Vehicles introduced in 1975